The 2016 Hamilton Tiger-Cats season was the 59th season for the team in the Canadian Football League and their 67th overall. The Tiger-Cats finished in 2nd place in the East Division and finished with a 7–11 record. The Tiger-Cats qualified for the playoffs for the fourth straight season, including their fourth straight season hosting a playoff game, but lost in the East Semi-Final to the Edmonton Eskimos 24–21. It was the first ever playoff match up between those two teams (not including Grey Cup games) and the third time that a crossover team won a playoff game.

CFL draft

Preseason

Regular season

Season Standings

Season Schedule

Post-season

Schedule

Team

Roster

Coaching staff

References

Hamilton Tiger-Cats seasons
2016 Canadian Football League season by team
Hamilton Tiger-Cats